Shirley of the Circus is a 1922 American silent drama film directed by Rowland V. Lee, and starring Shirley Mason, George O'Hara, Crauford Kent, Alan Hale Sr., and Lule Warrenton. The film was released by Fox Film Corporation on November 12, 1922.

Cast
Shirley Mason as Nita
George O'Hara as Pierre
Crauford Kent as James Blackthorne
Alan Hale Sr. as Max
Lule Warrenton as Blanquette
Maude Wayne as Susan Van Der Pyle
Mathilde Brundage as Mrs. Van Der Pyle

Preservation
The film is now considered lost.

See also
List of lost films
1937 Fox vault fire

References

External links

1922 drama films
Fox Film films
Silent American drama films
1922 films
American silent feature films
American black-and-white films
Lost American films
Films directed by Rowland V. Lee
1922 lost films
Lost drama films
1920s American films